Nate Smith may refer to:

Nate Smith (catcher) (born 1935), American baseball player
Nate Smith (golfer) (born 1983), American golfer
Nate Smith (musician) (born 1974), American drummer
Nate Smith (pitcher) (born 1991), baseball pitcher
Nate Smith (singer), American country music singer
Nate Smith (water skier) (born 1990), American water skier

See also
Nathaniel Smith (disambiguation)
Nathan Smith (disambiguation)